John Eyre (1771– ), a pardoned convict, was an early Australian painter and engraver.

Biography
Eyre was born in Coventry, Warwickshire in England. Aged 13 years in 1794, he was apprenticed to his father, a wool-comber and weaver, and became a Coventry freeman in August 1792. On 23 March 1799 he was sentenced to transportation for seven years for housebreaking, and reached Sydney in the transport Canada in December 1801.

Granted a conditional pardon on 4 June 1804, Eyre's early drawings are dated from around this time. He generally focused on urban landscapes, giving his creative output value as both works of art and historical records. Over the course of Eyre's artistic career, his work progressed from purely representative topographical depictions, to more artistic compositions with embellishments such as Aboriginal figures and ships at sea. This progression is typical of the developmental pattern of landscape depiction in the early colonial period.

He left the Colony as a free man in 1812; nothing is known of his later life.

See also
List of convicts transported to Australia
John Eyre (British artist) 1847-1927

References

1771 births
19th-century Australian artists
Australian engravers
Year of death missing

Convicts transported to Australia
Australian etchers
Australian landscape painters